Della Burford (born January 5, 1946 in Saskatoon, Saskatchewan) raised in Ottawa, Eston and Edmonton and is a Canadian artist and writer. Her Sacred Visionary Art has been inspired by dream, different cultures including India, ancient Celtic knowledge, shamanism, and imagination. 

Burford has a certificate from NYSID and graduate degrees from the University of Alberta and Queen's University. She was a Design teacher at Humber College North for six years.  In  1977, Della Burford's first book,  'Journey to Dodoland' was published in Los Angeles where she toured festivals leading workshops for children. At The World Symposium for Humanity she saw Buckminster Fuller, embraced his philosophy, and started working for humanity.  She has done storytelling, readings, live painting, writing and storytelling workshops at events and schools in Canada and internationally. Her books were plays in New York with Imaginations Unlimited.  Two performances were at the Third Street School Settlement in New York and the Smithsonian Institution Discovery Theatre in Washington.  In the 1980s her paintings and stories began to focus on the environment, and she began performing environmental stories as part of a project opportunity in Harlem, New York City. In 1990 her book, The Magical Earth Secrets, was published by the Western Canada Wilderness Committee.

She studied shamanistic clowning with Richard Pochinko. She worked for 17 years as an artist for Inner City Angels, a Toronto program where artist visit classrooms and work with teachers and students to build and show artistic activities.

Della was taught painting by her mother Desiree Burford who was a student of Jack Shadbolt. Burford has created 30 years of Visionary "Dream Wheels".  She presently lives on Vancouver Island.

Publications
 'Journey to Dodoland’  Los Angeles 1977 Printers Institute of America award Reference 2 In Review :  Canadian Books for Young People
 ’Magical Earth Secrets’ 1990 Western Canada Wilderness Committee best seller Canada foreword David Suzuki 
 ‘Environmental Activity Guide' Teacher and Home Study - Art in Action, nature as inspiration, Azatlan Publishing 1992 
 ‘Dodoland Adventures’ 2009, smaller more compact version of 'Journey to Dodoland' 
 'Journey to Lotus' poems and painting created in India,  
 ’Miracle Galaxy’ 2009, Eight angels guide one into health and happiness 
 'Bali Feeds the Soul, started with a poem by author/artist Della Burford, Fabrizio Belardetti and Dale Bertrand photographers. 
 'Bali Feeds your Dreams' Dreams lived, shared, and created, 
 'Spirit Storybooks' three traditional takes from around the world written by Aaron Zerah, Art by Della Burford, 
 'Dream Wheels' over 40 years of dreams recorded in yearly dream wheels  
 'Art for One World' Inspiration and Art Activities to make a difference!  Featuring the work of Della Burford, Dale Bertrand and Kazuko Asaba  
 'Dream Gifts for the Planet Earth' Sacred animals teach us about our connection to the elements  
 'Star Galaxy for the World' Take kindness, peace, intuitive, wonder, dream, transformative, and creative action for the world

See also
 List of children's literature authors
 Visionary art

References

 New York Magazine 12th Nov 1984 P 176  Children Journey to Dodoland  A meet the composer day with Larry Karush 
 Clark, Hugh A. “Our Beautiful World, The Green Revolution Comes to Kids’ Books,” Volume 18 Number 5 1990 September 
 Hay, Susan. “Professional Artists are Helping to Enrich Arts Programming in Inner City Schools.” Global News. 5 June 2013. 
 Arts Canada Volume 32 Society for Arts Publications Our Own Studio 587 Markham St.  1975 Show of the paintings of Journey to Dodoland 
 In Review: Canadian Books for Young People Volume 15 Ontario Provincial Library Services 
 Smithsonian year: Annual Report of the Smithsonian Institution ending in Sept 30th 1984 
 Smithsonian Institution Archives: Smithsonian Resident Associate Program, Young Associate Program New York  Program Records 1978- 1986 Student Questionnaire for Journey to Dodoland performance. 
 New York Magazine 12th Nov 1984 P 176  Children Journey to Dodoland  A meet the composer day with Larry Karush 
 New York Magazine 10 March 1986 Secrets of the Rainbow (Magical Earth Secrets will be presented at the Third Street Music School Settlement Larry Karush

External links
 Della Burford interviewed re Book/Play: 
 Della Burford interviewed by Inspire Health 
 Painting Style of Della Burford http://www.dellaburford.com/Portfolio.html
 Site based around Della Burford's books 
 Member page for Della for the Writers Union of Canada 
 Della speaking for the Visionary Art Award, the art conference with the personal and remote participation of speakers at the Moscow House of Artists,

Canadian women painters
Artists from Ottawa
Artists from Saskatoon
Living people
1946 births
Writers from Ottawa
Writers from Saskatoon
University of Alberta alumni
Queen's University at Kingston alumni
People from Eston, Saskatchewan
21st-century Canadian women artists